Letícia Wierzchowski (born June 4, 1972) is a Brazilian novelist best known for her novels A Casa das Sete Mulheres (House of the Seven Women) and Uma Ponte para Terebin (A Bridge to Terebin).  She has written fourteen other novels and children's books.

Writing
Wierzchowski was born at Porto Alegre, Brasil on June 4, 1972, the granddaughter of a Polish migrant. Wierzchowski's writing uses elements drawn from both her European family background and the background of their adopted country.
 
Many of her works are set in historic times of turmoil, revolution and war. Her best known book, A Casa das Sete Mulheres (House of the Seven Women) deals with the lives and relationships of women from a family whose men were occupied in the uprising Ragamuffin War in the mid 19th century. This novel has been translated into five languages and adapted by TV Globo on a broadcast minisseries aired in 23 countries.

Other writing such as her book of children's tales O dragão de Wawel e outras lendas polonesas (The Wawel Dragon and Other Polish Tales) are drawn directly from her Polish heritage, while the adult novel Uma ponte para Terebin (A Bridge to Terebin) tells the story of her grandfather, Jan Wierzchowski, who emigrated to Brazil in 1936, shortly before the outbreak of World War II.

List of works

Novels
 Cristal Polônes ("Polish Crystal")
 O Anjo e o Resto de Nós ("The Angel and the Rest of Us") - 1998
 Prata do Tempo ("Time Silvery") - 1999
 eu@teamo.com.br ("I@loveyou.com.br") - 1999
 A Casa das Sete Mulheres ("The Seven Women") - 2002
 O Pintor que Escrevia ("The Painter Who Writes") - 2003
 Um Farol no Pampa ("A Lighthouse on the Pampa") - 2004
 Uma Ponte para Terebin ("A Bridge to Terebin") - 2005
 De um Grande Amor e uma Perdição Maior Ainda ("A Great Love and A Great Doom") - 2007
 Os Aparados - 2009
 Os Getka - 2010
 Neptuno - 2012
 Sal - 2013

Children books
 O Dragão de Wawel e outras lendas polonesas ("The Wawel Dragon and other Polish legends") - 2005
 Todas as Coisas querem ser Outras Coisas ("All the Things who want to be Other Things") - 2006
 O Menino Paciente ("The Patient Boy") - 2007
 Era uma Vez um Gato Xadrez ("Once there was a Checkered Cat") - 2008

References

External links
 Wierzchowski website

1972 births
Living people
People from Porto Alegre
Brazilian people of Polish descent
Brazilian women novelists
20th-century Brazilian novelists
20th-century Brazilian women writers
21st-century Brazilian novelists
21st-century Brazilian women writers